Bhamboi is a village in Batala in Gurdaspur district of Punjab State, India. The village is administrated by an elected representative of the village known as a Sarpanch.

See also
List of villages in India

References 

Villages in Gurdaspur district